The 2000 Asian Canoe Slalom Championships were the 1st Asian Canoe Slalom Championships and took place from November 4–7, 2000 in China.

Medal summary

Medal table

References

Results

External links
Official ACC site

Canoe
Asian Canoe Slalom Championships
Asian Canoeing Championships
International sports competitions hosted by China